Soldiers is a 1956 Soviet drama film directed by Aleksandr Ivanov.

Plot 
The film takes place during the Great Patriotic War. The film tells about lieutenant Kerzhentsev, his connected Valega and intelligence officer Sedykh, who are heading for Stalingrad.

Cast 
 Vsevolod Safonov as Kerzhentsev
 Innokentiy Smoktunovskiy	
 Tamara Loginova
 Leonid Kmit
 Nikolay Pogodin
 Oleg Dashkevich as Soldier
 Lyudmila Markeliya
 Yury Solovyov
 Evgeniy Teterin

References

External links 
 

1956 films
1950s Russian-language films
Soviet drama films
1950s war drama films
Soviet black-and-white films